Physiological movements or normal movements are the natural movements that occur in human joints. They are also known as osteokinematic movements.

The study of these movements is known as kinesiology.

Body positions to describe physiological movements  

Fundamental position

Anatomical position

General descriptions
Flexion

Extension

Abduction

Adduction

Joints and their physiological movements

Upper extremity

Shoulder 
 Flexion
 Eion
 Abduction
 Adduction
 External rotation
 Internal rotation
 Horizontal abduction
 Horizontal adduction
 Circumduction

Elbow 
 Flexion
 Extension

Wrist 
 Flexion
 Extension
 Radial deviation
 Ulnar deviation

Lower Extremity

Hip 
 Flexion
 Extension
 Abduction
 Adduction
 Internal rotation
 External rotation

Knee 
 Flexion
 Extension

Ankle 
 Dorsal flexion
 Plantar flexion
 Eversion
 Inversion

Physiology